Ndaw (also N'daw,  Ndow or Ndao ) is a typical Gambian and Senegalese patronym of the Serer people.  They are the same people but because the French colonised Senegal and the British colonised the Gambia, they are spelt differently but pronounced the same way.  This surname is also common among the Wolof people, but it is mainly due to Wolof absorption of Serer culture, and Wolof people having Serer ancestry.

People surnamed Ndaw, N'daw or Ndao include:

Abdoul Aziz Ndaw, Senegalese politician and diplomat
Guirane N'Daw, Senegalese footballer
Moussa Ndao, Senegalese footballer

Notes

Serer surnames